Melissa Blasek is an American politician in the state of New Hampshire. She was a member of the New Hampshire House of Representatives, sitting as a Republican from the Hillsborough-21 multi-member district from 2020 to 2022.

Career
Blasek graduated summa cum laude from Berklee College of Music in Massachusetts. She currently teaches private voice, guitar and piano lessons in southern New Hampshire.

Blasek has been among a group of Republican representatives opposed to the way the Sununu administration has handled the COVID-19 pandemic in New Hampshire. Blasek is a leader in the organization RebuildNH, which is opposed to vaccine mandates and believes that masks should be optional for children in schools.

References 

Republican Party members of the New Hampshire House of Representatives
Women state legislators in New Hampshire
Living people
Year of birth missing (living people)